Any Way the Wind Blows is a 2003 Belgian film directed by Tom Barman, the lead singer of the Belgian rockband dEUS. The film is set in Antwerp and follows the lives of several characters intertwining with each other. Thanks to its rock music, jazz, pop and electronica music soundtrack, the film has become a cult film. The theme song Summer's Here by Magnus was a hit at the time.

Premise 
Set in Antwerp on a sunny Friday in the beginning of June, eight people dream of having a different life. There is wind and music, police and paranoia, gossip, fighting and in the evening, a party.

Cast

Soundtrack
 Magnus – "Summer's Here"
 Charles Mingus – "Mysterious Blues"
 Squarepusher – "My Red Hot Car"
 Toy – "Suspicion"
 Oliver Nelson – "Elegy For A Duck"
 Max Berlin – "Elle Et Moi"
 Charlie Parker – "In the Still of the Night"
 Young MC – "Got More Rhymes"
 The Kids – "There Will Be No Next Time"
 Yazoo – "Situation"
 Tiefschwarz – "Acid Soule"
 Magnus – "Rhythm Is Deified"
 Ils – "Next Level / 6 Space"
 J.J. Cale – "Magnolia"
 Evil Superstars – "Holy Spirit Come Home"
 Stade – "Anatonal"
 Aphrodite – "Lava Flows"
 Roots Manuva – "Witness One Hope"
 Herbie Hancock – "Curiosity"

References

External links
 

2003 films
2000s Dutch-language films
2000s English-language films
Belgian comedy-drama films
Belgian rock music films
Jazz films
Electronic music films
Dance music films
2000s French-language films
Antwerp in fiction
Films shot in Antwerp
Films set in Antwerp
2003 comedy-drama films
English-language Belgian films
French-language Belgian films